is a type of Japanese pottery, specifically an unusually high-quality porcelain Arita ware. It was produced in Lord Nabeshima of Saga Domain's kiln at Okawachi near Arita in the Edo period, for the use and profit of the family. The name therefore derives from the family. The Okawachi kiln was already in use, and continued to make other wares at the same time.  Production began around 1700, and continued until the late 19th century, with similar wares being produced elsewhere by descendants of the master lineage  to the present day

Unlike most Arita ware, the designs drew on Japanese rather than Chinese traditions, especially those of textile design, and are often marked by a free use of empty space. Much of the wares were dishes for food made in sets of five, with a high foot. These followed in shape the dishes in lacquered wood, which until then were the preferred dining dishes used by the aristocracy.  The Nabeshima used them themselves and gave them to other feudal lords as prestige gifts. Very few were exported until the Meiji period. A variety of designs are used, ranging from the abstract to the representational.  Animal and plant designs are popular, and designs showing three patterned jars are a particular feature.

The technique also differs from that of most Japanese porcelain, with the outlines of the pattern done in underglaze blue before the overglaze "enamelled" final decoration.

One of the patterns used is Karako (唐子) with the depiction of Chinese children playing.

Notes

References

Ford, Barbara Brennan, and Oliver R. Impey, Japanese Art from the Gerry Collection in The Metropolitan Museum of Art, 1989, Metropolitan Museum of Art, fully online
Smith, Lawrence, Harris, Victor and Clark, Timothy, Japanese Art: Masterpieces in the British Museum, 1990, British Museum Publications, 

Culture in Saga Prefecture
Japanese porcelain